Dutchmans Creek is a  long 1st order tributary to the Uwharrie River, in Montgomery County, North Carolina.

Course
Dutchmans Creek rises on the Lick Fork divide about 0.25 miles northwest of Liberty Hill in Montgomery County, North Carolina.  Dutchmans Creek then flows northwest to meet the Uwharrie River about 1.5 miles north of Lake in the Pine.

Watershed
Dutchmans Creek Creek drains  of area, receives about 48.0 in/year of precipitation, has a topographic wetness index of 330.89 and is about 93% forested.

See also
List of rivers of North Carolina

References

Rivers of North Carolina
Rivers of Montgomery County, North Carolina